Amarillos por Chile, sometimes written Amarillos x Chile (AxCh), is a Chilean political movement and party founded by Cristián Warnken in 2022, which brings together personalities from the country such as businessmen, former parliamentarians and former politicians from the defunct Concertación coalition, especially from the PPD and PDC. The collective emerged as a criticism of certain proposals of the Constitutional Convention that the movement considered, in its words, as "refoundational".

History 
It arose from columns and letters that Warnken wrote in the radio station Pauta FM and in the newspaper El Mercurio. One was called Yellow letter to my children, it was published on 27 November 2021, and in it he talks about an episode that he lived in Isla Negra, when a group of young people yelled "amarillo" and "facho" at him. He took the "amarillo" concept from the 1970s, when it was used to disqualify reformists. The term had been updated before by Patricio Fernández Chadwick, who published a column in The Clinic fortnightly on 26 July 2018. Warnken published the Letter column to all the yellow bases in the country in Pauta on 6 February 2022, which triggered the founding of the movement.

On 23 September 2022, the founding manifesto of Amarillos por Chile as a political party was presented, along with presenting its provisional directive. In the same way, the first 100 militants were presented, who were mainly ex-militants and ex-politicians of the Party for Democracy and Christian Democratic Party. On 21 October 2022, the Electoral Service (Servel) declared the community as "in formation".

References 

Political parties in Chile
Political parties established in 2022
Political movements in Chile